Oxalis lasiandra, common names palm tree oxalis and Mexican shamrock, is a plant species native to the Mexican State of Oaxaca but grown as an ornamental in other regions.

It is closely related to  O. magnifica but the bulb scales have 15–25 nerves. Leaves have 7–9 leaflets. Flowers are pink to crimson, drooping at night but pointing upward in the daytime.

References

lasiandra
Flora of Oaxaca